Herbert Dörenberg (born 27 August 1945) is a retired German football midfielder and later manager.

References

1945 births
Living people
German footballers
SC Opel Rüsselsheim players
SV Darmstadt 98 players
VfR Bürstadt players
Association football midfielders
2. Bundesliga players
German football managers
1. FSV Mainz 05 managers
SV Wehen Wiesbaden managers
FSV Frankfurt managers